Zhanna Henadziyeuna Shapialevich (née Shitsik) (born February 26, 1971, in Hrodna) is a Belarusian sport shooter. Shapialevich made her official debut for the 1996 Summer Olympics in Atlanta, Georgia, where she placed fourteenth in the women's 25 m pistol, accumulating a score of 577 points.

Twelve years after competing in her last Olympics, Shapialevich qualified for her second Belarusian team, as a 37-year-old, at the 2008 Summer Olympics in Beijing, by finishing eighth in the sport pistol from the 2006 ISSF World Shooting Championships in Zagreb, Croatia. She placed forty-second out of forty-four shooters in the women's 10 m air pistol by one point ahead of Uruguay's Carolina Lozado, with a total score of 368 targets. Three days later, Shapialevich competed for her second event, 25 m pistol, where she was able to shoot 287 targets in the precision stage, and 282 in the rapid fire, for a total score of 569 points, finishing only in thirty-eighth place.

References

External links
NBC 2008 Olympics profile

1971 births
Belarusian female sport shooters
Living people
Olympic shooters of Belarus
Shooters at the 1996 Summer Olympics
Shooters at the 2008 Summer Olympics
Sportspeople from Grodno